The 1921 Buffalo Bisons football team represented the University of Buffalo as an independent during the 1921 college football season. Led by Art Powell in his sixth season as head coach, the team compiled a record of 2–3–2.

Schedule

References

Buffalo
Buffalo Bulls football seasons
Buffalo Bison football